Inisheltia (Gaeilge: Inis Aillte) is an uninhabited island in County Galway. There are few buildings on the island, but the ruins of an abandoned farmhouse and cottage remain.

Demographics

References

Uninhabited islands of Ireland
Islands of County Galway